Mt. St. Helens Vietnam Band is a band from Seattle that features Benjamin Verdoes as lead vocalist and guitarist, Peter Verdoes on second guitar, Marshall Verdoes as the drummer, and Jared Price on bass. They were signed with Dead Oceans,  and released two albums and two EPs between 2008 and 2011 before going on an extended hiatus.

Formation 
While Benjamin Verdoes, Peter Verdoes, Matthew Dammer and Jared Price had previously performed as part of the locally successful Lujo Records band In Praise of Folly, Traci Eggleston and Marshall Verdoes were new to the stage  They gained notability through local advertising and comical PSA videos on MySpace and YouTube featuring band members before making any of their music public.

Beginnings 
Their official debut appearance was July 31, 2008 at Seattle's Neumos, where their self released EP "Weepy" was available for the first time. Mt. St. Helens Vietnam Band signed with Dead Oceans in the fall of 2008 and released their self-entitled first LP in the spring of 2009.  They toured with Bishop Allen, Cursive, Frog Eyes, Japandroids, The Globes, The Growlers, David Bazan, and Dead Confederate.

Hiatus 
In 2011 Benjamin Verdoes put the band on hiatus to focus on his newly-formed duo Iska Dhaaf with Nathan Quiroga.

Reunion 
In 2021 the band began quietly recording and releasing music and animated film clips to subscribers on Patreon.com

On June 20, 2022 the band announced their first show in nine years, playing at Neumos in Seattle on July 31. This date would coincide with the 14-year anniversary of the band's debut at the same venue.

Mt. St. Helens Vietnam Band released their first commercially available single since their reformation, "Eyes Wide Shut" on July 20, 2022 through Jenny Invert Records /.

Discography 
Weepy EP – 2008 (self-released)
Mt. St. Helens Vietnam Band LP – 2009 (Dead Oceans)
Where the Messengers Meet LP – 2010 (Dead Oceans)
Prehistory EP – 2012 (Dead Oceans)

References

External links 
2010 Mt. St. Helens Vietnam Band Interview at Bandega.com

Alternative rock groups from Washington (state)
Musical groups established in 2000
Dead Oceans artists